Sadi Jalali (born 6 June 1995) is a former Canadian professional soccer player who last played as a forward for FC Edmonton in the North American Soccer League.

Career

Early career
Born in New Delhi, India to Afghan parents. Jalali moved to Quebec City, Quebec when he was only one year old. He then moved to Richmond, British Columbia when he was three years old and then to Edmonton, Alberta when he was five years old. While growing up, Jalali played soccer, basketball, and volleyball. He started playing club soccer for Millwoods Soccer Association. He then spent three seasons at Edmonton Juventus before spending six months with the Vancouver Whitecaps FC Residency.

FC Edmonton
After spending time with FC Edmonton as a reserve player, Jalali signed a professional contract with the North American Soccer League side on 20 February 2013. He then made his professional debut for Edmonton in a league match on 13 April 2013 against the Carolina RailHawks at WakeMed Soccer Park, in which he came on as a 74th-minute substitute for Michael Cox as Edmonton went on to lose the match 2–1. In September 2014, FC Edmonton announced Jalali had signed a contract extension to keep him at the club. In July 2016 FC Edmonton released him.

International
Jalali is eligible to represent Canada and Afghanistan (through his parents). Due to him representing Canada at the under-17 level meant that he had given up his Indian passport to acquire a Canadian one, thus he can not represent India unless he gives up Canadian citizenship.

Jalali represented the Canada U17 side for the first time during the 2011 CONCACAF U-17 Championship in which he made his debut for Canada on 17 February 2011 against Barbados' U17s and even scored his first international goal in that match as Canada went on to win 8–0. Jalali would eventually win a silver-medal in that tournament as Canada finished in 2nd place behind the United States. He would then go on to represent Canada at the 2011 FIFA U-17 World Cup in which he scored for Canada against England's U17s on 22 June 2011 in a match that would end 2–2 and thus Canada's chances of advancing out of the group in the top 2. Jalali was named to the U20 squad that went to the 2014 Milk Cup, where he scored a goal in the second game of the tournament against China.

Personal life

Legal trouble 
In August 2016 Sadi and his brother Saidkheyam were arrested by members of the Alberta Law Enforcement Response Team in separate traffic stops. Investigators alleged the pair were in possession of cocaine, cash, and a 9-mm handgun.

Career statistics

References

External links 
 FC Edmonton Profile.

1995 births
Living people
Association football forwards
Canada men's youth international soccer players
Canadian people of Afghan descent
Canadian soccer players
FC Edmonton players
Afghan footballers
North American Soccer League players
People from New Delhi
People from Richmond, British Columbia
Soccer people from British Columbia
Sportspeople of Afghan descent